Kotonishiki Noboru (March 7, 1922 – July 14, 1974, born Noboru Fujimura) was a sumo wrestler and coach from Kanonji, Kagawa, Japan. His highest rank was komusubi. He was runner-up in the January 1949 tournament and earned seven gold stars for defeating yokozuna. After his retirement in 1955 he founded the Sadogatake stable and produced yokozuna Kotozakura among others. He ran the stable until his death in 1974.

Career record

See also
List of past sumo wrestlers
List of komusubi

References

1922 births
1974 deaths
Japanese sumo wrestlers
Komusubi